The Hong Kong Nuclear Investment Company Limited (HKNIC) is a company in Hong Kong. It is a wholly-owned subsidiary company of CLP Holdings Limited. The company invests in Guangdong Nuclear Power Joint Venture Company Limited which owns the Daya Bay Nuclear Power Plant in Guangdong, supplying 25% of Hong Kong electricity demand.

History
HKNIC was founded in 1983 in British Hong Kong as the subsidiary of China Light and Power Company Limited (CLP Power) to invest in nuclear power in Guangdong, across the border in China. In January 1985, HKINC signed a contract with Guangdong Nuclear Investment Company Limited to form the Guangdong Nuclear Power Joint Venture Company Limited, to be the owner and operator of Daya Bay Nuclear Power Plant.

In 2003, Guangdong Nuclear Power Joint Venture Company Limited formed the Daya Bay Nuclear Power Operations and Maintenance Company Limited with Ling Ao Nuclear Power Company Limited to operate the Daya Bay Nuclear Power Plant and Ling Ao Nuclear Power Plant in Guangdong.

Activities
HKNIC regularly holds public outreach programs, such as public visits to Daya Bay Nuclear Power Plant, publication of technical pamphlets, public exhibition on nuclear energy and school talks.

See also
 Nuclear energy in Hong Kong
 Electricity sector in Hong Kong
 CLP Group

References

External links
 

Holding companies of Hong Kong
Energy companies of Hong Kong
Electric power companies of Hong Kong
companies established in 1983
Holding companies established in 1983
Non-renewable resource companies established in 1983
1983 establishments in Hong Kong